Europe at War 1939–1945: No Simple Victory is a history book about World War II in Europe, written by the English historian Norman Davies and first published by Macmillan in 2006. Published sixty years after World War II, Davies argues that a number of misconceptions about the war are still common and then sets out to address them. Two of his main claims are that, contrary to popular belief in the West, the dominant part of the conflict took place in Eastern Europe between the two totalitarian systems of the century - communism and fascism - and that Stalin's USSR was as bad as Hitler's Germany. The subtitle No Simple Victory does therefore not just refer to the losses and suffering the Allies had to endure in order to defeat the enemy, but also the difficult moral choice the Western democracies had to make when allying themselves with one criminal regime in order to defeat another.

See also 

 Historiography of World War II

References

External links

2006 non-fiction books
21st-century history books
Books by Norman Davies
English-language books
History books about World War II